Amanita neoovoidea is a species of Amanita found in China and Japan

Toxicity
Consumption of Amanita neoovoidea has caused acute renal failure.

References

External links

neoovoidea
Fungi of Asia
Poisonous fungi
Fungi described in 1976